tRNA-splicing endonuclease subunit Sen2 is an enzyme that in humans is encoded by the TSEN2 gene.

tRNA splicing is a fundamental process required for cell growth and division. SEN2 is a subunit of the tRNA splicing endonuclease, which catalyzes the removal of introns, the first step in tRNA splicing (Paushkin et al., 2004).[supplied by OMIM]

Interactions
TSEN2 has been shown to interact with TSEN34 and TSEN15.

References

External links
 GeneReviews/NCBI/NIH/UW entry on Pontocerebellar Hypoplasia Type 2 and Type 4

Further reading